Raja Bazaar (Urdu: راجہ بازار) is the main commercial, residential hub and shopping district and a union council of Rawalpindi. It is located near to the Fawara Chowk. 

Raja Bazaar Rawalpindi has some major business and commercial centres, branches of major banks and wide residential areas of British colonial era. Many roads linked with Raja Bazaar i.e. Trunk Bazar, Liquat Road, Moti Bazar, Bhabra Bazaar, Namak Mandi and Narnkari Bazaar.

Demographic
Raja Bazaar is the home of old and British era's residential and commercial buildings and has more narrow streets. Raja Bazaar Rawalpindi covers a wide range of small markets and Bazaars like the Kapra Bazaar, Lakar Bazaar, Masala Bazaar, and Sabzi Mandi. It has an RDA Parking Plaza to its center.

District Headquarters Hospital
District Headquarters Hospital Rawalpindi, affiliated with Rawalpindi Medical College provides basic health care to the residents of inner and old city and also serves a referral centre for trauma patients.

Roadside vendors
Raja Bazaar has several commodities such as used books, buckets, ropes, soap cases, hair bands, bangles, bags, and other accessories are available from roadside vendors. These roadside small shops are the major attraction of raja bazaar. At the end of the week the pavements on either side of which the shops are located in Raja Bazaar are crowded by Juma Bazaar.

References

Union Councils of Rawalpindi City
Rawalpindi City
Populated places in Rawalpindi City
Market towns in Pakistan
Tourist attractions in Rawalpindi
Shopping districts and streets in Pakistan
Bazaars in Rawalpindi